Eric Denaud Green (born March 16, 1982) is a former American football cornerback. He was drafted by the Arizona Cardinals in the third round of the 2005 NFL Draft. He played college football at Virginia Tech.

Green was also a member of the Miami Dolphins, San Francisco 49ers and Omaha Nighthawks.

Early years
Green played high school football at Clewiston High School in Clewiston, Florida where he played quarterback, wide receiver, and defensive back.  He earned All-State Honors as a senior with 1,100 passing yards and 400+ rushing.

He also participated in track and field, where he placed fifth in 110m hurdles with a time of 14.3 seconds.

College career
Green played college football for the Virginia Tech Hokies.  During his career, he recorded 143 tackles (91 solo), four blocked kicks, and 25 pass deflections.  He also posted eight interceptions with 264 return yards, third most in school history.

Professional career

Arizona Cardinals
Drafted in the 3rd round in 2005, Green played in 12 games and started 5. He played in 15 games in 2006, starting 8, and leading with 13 defensed passes. He started the first 11 games of 2007 having 56 tackles, but on November 27 was placed on injured reserve with a groin injury.
A restricted free agent in the 2008 offseason, Green signed his one-year, $2.017 million first-round tender offer on April 3, 2008.

Miami Dolphins
An unrestricted free agent after the 2008 season, Green signed with the Miami Dolphins on March 12, 2009. He was released on August 19.

San Francisco 49ers
Green signed with the San Francisco 49ers hours after being released by the Dolphins on August 19.

Personal life
In January 2010, Green was named in a lawsuit that alleged he forcibly sodomized a transgender woman in early 2009 in Arizona. That lawsuit was dismissed. Green's attorney claim Green was never served. The plaintiff's attorney claims he was not served because the suit settled. In October 2010, the suit was re-filed in federal court claiming Green failed to make the first payment. The suit asks for $10 million.
he opened his own gym a few years later, now living in his home town. He participates in the community and lives a quiet life.

References

External links
Arizona Cardinals bio  
San Francisco 49ers bio
Virginia Tech Hokies bio
Just Sports Stats

1982 births
Living people
People from Pahokee, Florida
Players of American football from Florida
American football cornerbacks
Virginia Tech Hokies football players
Arizona Cardinals players
Miami Dolphins players
San Francisco 49ers players
Omaha Nighthawks players